The Swastika Stone is a stone adorned with a design that resembles a swastika, located on the Woodhouse Crag on the northern edge of Ilkley Moor in West Yorkshire, England. The design has a double outline with four curved arms and an attached S-shape, each enclosing a so-called 'cup' mark, the like of which can be found on other stones nearby. 

The design is thought to be rare in the British Isles, so its close similarity to Camunian rose designs in Italy have led some to theorise that the two are connected. In fact, the troops stationed in Ilkley during Roman occupation were recruited from the Celtic Lingones. This tribe was native to Gaul, but in around 400 BC, some migrated across the Alps to the Adriatic coast. Some believe the Ilkley Lingones were recruited from here rather than from Gaul. It is possible that the Italian Lingones passed through the Valcamonica region at some point, took on the swastika designs they found as part of their tribal symbolism, and carved it on the nearby moor when stationed in Ilkley.

See also
 Camunian rose
 Fylfot
 Germanic pre-Christian use of the swastika
 Lauburu
 Western use of the swastika in the early 20th century

References

External links

The Swastika Stone

Prehistoric Britain
Archaeological sites in West Yorkshire 
Swastika
Petroglyphs
Ilkley
Stones